Scopula rostrilinea is a moth of the family Geometridae. It is found in Colombia.

References

Moths described in 1900
rostrilinea
Moths of South America